Heliocheilus ranalaetensis is a moth in the family Noctuidae. It is endemic to South Australia.

The larvae possibly feed on Triodia scariosa.

External links
Australian Faunal Directory

Heliocheilus
Moths of Australia